The Exemplary Public Official Medal (abbreviated to EPO as the post-nominal) is an award bestowed to exemplary public official with 6th Grade (Assistant Director level)) or under, by the Prime Minister for the executive branch and devolved provincial governments, Speaker of the National Assembly of Korea for legislative branch, Chief Justice of Supreme Court and President of Constitutional Court for judicial branch, and Chairperson of National Election Commission of Korea for independent electoral commission as each of highest constitutional institution. Originally issued as a plaque under Presidential Decree #6971, dated Jan. 15, 1980.  It was changed to a medal under Presidential Decree #11360, dated Feb. 18, 1984.

Privileges 
Initially, social privileges for those, who achieved Exemplary Public Official Medal, according to the No. 6971, Presidential Decree of the Republic of Korea.

According to Section 8-2 of the Decree, each Exemplary Public Official has rights:
 of additional payment within fifty thousand Korean Won per month for three years
 of primary consideration for promoting to higher grade

References

External links

Orders, decorations, and medals of South Korea
Awards established in 1973